Ann Burton (March 4, 1933, Amsterdam – November 29, 1989, Amsterdam) is the pseudonym of Johanna Rafalowicz (between 1938 and 1971: Johanna de Paauw), a Dutch jazz singer.

Early life

In about 1930 the mother of Ann Burton (pseudonym of Johanna Rafalowicz) immigrated from Poland to the Netherlands. 
Ann was born in Netherlands and when she was 3 years old, in 1933, her mother married a diamond worker.

In 1938 Johanna's surname was changed to her stepfather's and she became Johanna de Paauw, which was her official name until 1971, when she again changed it back to Rafalowicz. During World War II her family faced Jewish persecution under German occupation and she went into hiding while her mother and stepfather survived the Nazi concentration camps.

However, the family became disrupted when her (step) parents were deprived of parental power. Johanna, who had Polish nationality, acquired Dutch nationality in 1957.

Johanna had never had singing lessons, but she had listened to American singers like Doris Day, Jo Stafford, Rosemary Clooney, Ella Fitzgerald and Sarah Vaughan. Later, Billie Holiday and Shirley Horn influenced her. She wanted to get into the music world and so in about 1955 she took the name Ann Burton inspired by the Welsh actor Richard Burton.

Musical career

Ann Burton began her career as singer by a quintet in Luxemburg. She sang with bandleader Johnny Millstonford and performed in clubs with the orchestra of Ted Powder for American soldiers in Germany.

In the summer of 1958 she sang in the quartet of pianist Pia Beck in Scheveningen and in 1960 they toured with saxophonist Piet Noordijk in Spain and Morocco. Back in the Netherlands she sang again in Scheveningen. In 1965, she made an EP for Decca Records with the :nl:Frans Elsen Trio. Later she joined Ramses Shaffy's group Shaffy Chantant.

In the late sixties she was noticed by John J. Vis, the director of the record company Artone, and he produced her first album "Blue Burton" in 1967. On this record the trio of Louis van Dijk, :de:Jacques Schols and :nl:John Engels, supplemented with :de:Piet Noordijk, accompanied her. She became popular and the album received an Edison Award in 1969. A few more records in 1969 and 1972 were released in collaboration with John Vis.

In 1973, she toured Japan, where she became the most popular jazz singer, second only to Ella Fitzgerald. She made numerous albums with Masahiko Sato and Ken McCarthy and others. In the late seventies she worked in New York, where she made several albums, some of which were with Grady Tate and Buster Williams. Singer Helen Merrill produced the albums. For "New York State of Mind" Burton also received an Edison award. In the eighties she founded her own record label, Burtone, that produced her albums. In the period 1986–1988 she taught at the Amsterdam Conservatory.

Ann Burton died at the age of 56 due to throat cancer.

Discography

Albums

Bibliography
 Anneke Muller. Blue Burton. Schoorl: Conserve, 1999. ISBN nummer 90-5429-129-X

References

 Ann Burton official website
 Liner notes to "Blue Burton" with bio

1933 births
1989 deaths
Dutch jazz singers
Musicians from Amsterdam
20th-century Dutch women singers
Dutch people of Polish descent